The women's 45 kg competition at the 2018 World Weightlifting Championships was held on 2 November 2018.

Schedule

Medalists

Records

Results

References

External links
Results 
Results 

Women's 45 kg
2018 in women's weightlifting